Misión S.O.S. is a Mexican telenovela produced by Rosy Ocampo for Televisa. It premiered on August 2, 2004 and ended on January 21, 2005. It stars Maribel Guardia, Guillermo Capetillo, Diego González, and Allisson Lozz.

Plot 
The story follows the life of Diana, a pre-teen who lives in a neighborhood called Buenaventura, along with her friends, Alonso, Federica, Rodrigo, Alejandro and Dany. Christian has moved from New York to Mexico due to his parents' divorce. Diana and Christian quickly become best friends, despite their families hatred for each other. Years before, Christian's father and Diana's mother were in love, but their relationship was soured by Severiano, Christian's grumpy and selfish grandfather.

However, the neighbors of Buenaventura have even darker futures, as they are in danger of losing their homes, their school and much more, because the evil old Severiano plans to tear down the neighborhood and build an enormous shopping mall in its place. To accomplish his plan, Severiano is willing to resort to any means, and will provoke a series of disasters to drive the inhabitants away.

The decrepit old theater is the children's favorite spot, and this is where they meet a mysterious little man who will change their lives and the fate of Buenaventura forever. Chaneque, a friendly elf, is a magical being who is on an important mission: to save his elf-world from destruction. Chaneque convinces the group of young friends to join in his quest to save his dying world. From that point, the children and their new friend embark on an exhilarating series of adventures. During their fantastic journey, they gather important clues to save their own neighborhood as well. But once this mission is accomplished, will Christian and Diana also find a way to end the feud between their families and bring them together forever?

Cast 
 Maribel Guardia as Ximena Lozano, adult heroine, Salvador's love interest
 Guillermo Capetillo as Salvador Martinez, adult hero, Ximena's love interest
 Manuel Ojeda as Severiano Martinez, antagonist
 Gabriela Goldsmith as Vivian Johnson, antagonist, Christian's mother who does not love him
 Magda Guzmán as Justina Aranda, Diana's grandmother, suffers from arthritis
 Maribel Fernández as Angeles, Severiano's servant and maid, Christian's friend
 Diana Golden as Doris Ramirez, Federica and Rodrigo's mother, likes to think she is rich, verbally abuses Federica
 Raúl Magaña as Leonardo, antagonist, works for Severiano
 Silvia Lomeli as Lidia Rendon, the children's teacher
 Johnny Lozada as Gonzalo Ortega, Alejandro and Dany's father, irresponsible
 Zaide Silvia Gutiérrez as Lupe Espinos, Alonso and Monica's mother
 Roberto Sen as Rosendo Espinos, beats his children, changes his ways in the end
 Lucia Guilamin as Ramona Acevedo, Monchita's aunt, principal of the elementary school
 Alejandro Ruiz as Ezequiel Guerra, Federica and Rodrigo's father, works for Severiano
 Adalberto Parra as El Tlacuahe, a hobo that the children are scared of, ends up being Ximena's long lost brother
 Marco Uriel as Edor, antagonist, terrible being in the Chaneque world
 Aurora Clavel as Pura
 Juan Peláez as Augusto
 Wendy González as Monica Espinos, adolescent heroine, Felipe's love interest
 Marco Antonio Valdes as Felipe Lozano, adolescent hero, Monica's love interest
 Naidelyn Narravete as Gaby, adolescent antagonist, tries to break up Monica and Felipe 
 Ricardo De Pascual Jr. as Fermín
 Erick Guecha as Diego "El Dragón" López
 Jonathan Becerra as Alejandro Ortega, Dany's big brother, is responsible for Dany and often wins money so they are able to eat
 Diego González as Christian Martinez, child hero, Diana's love interest
 Allisson Lozz as Diana Lozano, child heroine, Christian's love interest
 Miguel Martínez as Rodrigo Guerra, child antagonist, stubborn and jealous of Christian, eventually accepts everything and becomes good
 Jesús Zavala as El Chaneque, hero, the children's elf friend
 Alejandro Correa as Dany Ortega, Alejandro's younger brother
 Anhuar Escalante as Alonso, physically abused by his father, suffers from asthma and enjoys reading fairytales
 Gladys Gallegos as Federica Guerra, verbally abused by her family
 Marijose Salazar as Monchita Acevedo, child antagonist, greedy to the Pandilla, in the end joins the mission and becomes good 
 Alex Rivera as Hugo, child antagonist, fights Alejandro, becomes good in the end and joins the mission
 Alejandro Speitzer as QuechaneChale, one of the male Chaneques
 María Chacón as Chanya, one of the female Chaneques
 Nora Cano as Chanequita, one of the female Chaneques
 Alex Goldberg as Piropolo, one of the male Chaneques
 Irma Lozano as Clemencia

Soundtrack

References

External links 
 Official site on Televisa
 

2004 telenovelas
2004 Mexican television series debuts
2005 Mexican television series endings
Mexican telenovelas
Televisa telenovelas
Spanish-language telenovelas